Kylie Peters (born ) is a former Australian cricketer. She played three List A matches for Queensland during the 1996–97 season of the Women's National Cricket League (WNCL). She was also active in international indoor cricket. Hailing from Mackay, Queensland, Peters is a schoolteacher outside of cricket.

References

External links
 
 

1970s births
Year of birth missing (living people)
Place of birth missing (living people)
Living people
Australian cricketers
Australian women cricketers
Queensland Fire cricketers
People from Mackay, Queensland
Sportswomen from Queensland